The Battle of Focșani (also Battle of Fokschani or Battle of Focsani) was a battle in the Russo-Turkish War (1787–1792) fought on 1 August 1789 between the Ottoman Empire and the alliance of the Russian Empire and the Habsburg monarchy near Focșani, Moldavia (now in Romania). The Russians were led by Alexander Suvorov, the Austrians by Prince Josias of Coburg, and the Ottomans by Osman Pasha.

The Austrian army numbered 18,000 Austrian and Hungarian troops. The Russian contingent was made up of 7,000 soldiers. The Ottomans mustered ca. 30,000 soldiers.

The allies stormed the Ottoman entrenched camp and drove the Turks out of Moldavia.

The Moldavian campaign begins
As the campaigning season of 1789 began, Koca Yusuf Pasha, Grand Vizier of the Ottoman Empire, took steps to defend the provinces of Moldavia and Wallachia. He faced the prospect of offensives from two directions. To the northwest lay an Austrian army of 18,000 men under Coburg. Meanwhile, Suvorov was marching Russian troops into Moldavia from the northeast. Yusuf Pasha determined to attack the Austrian forces before they could link up with their Russian allies. To this end, he ordered Osman Pasha to lead an army of 30,000 men north to Focșani. The town was an important trade center strategically located on the border between Moldavia and Wallachia. Learning of the Ottoman approach, Coburg asked his Russian counterpart for assistance.  Suvorov marched with 7,000 men.  He left his position at Bârlad on July 28 and marched 40 miles in 28 hours to reach Coburg the next day on the Siret River.

Preparation for battle
The Russians and Austrians advanced from the Siret in two columns. Suvorov commanded the left column, Coburg the right. They made contact with Osman Pasha's outposts on July 31 and drove them back on the main Turkish army at Focșani.

On August 1, Suvorov and Coburg drew up their forces in two lines, with their infantry in squares. The illustration accompanying this article shows infantry in square formations.

In previous engagements with the Ottomans, the Russian Army had deployed its infantry in line. Russian commanders soon found that using linear tactics against the Turks led to disaster. The Ottomans attacked the long and thin Russian lines with masses of excellent cavalry, which were able to pierce the Russian formations and break them into fragments. Suvorov and others reorganized their battle formations into square. These squares could repel Ottoman cavalry charges and then advance to win battles. Suvorov used squares made up of individual regiments and battalions, disposed in a checkerboard pattern, with skirmishers in loose order. His battlefield deployment led to more flexibility, speed, mutual fire support, ability to break through the Ottoman defenses, and steadfastness in repelling Turkish cavalry and light infantry attacks.

The Austrians had reached a conclusion similar to that of the Russians. In the Austro-Turkish War (1737–1739), the Austrians had used linear tactics against the Ottomans. Now they adopted infantry squares arranged to offer mutual support.

Ironically, by the late 18th century, Ottoman cavalry such as feudal sipahis and deli volunteers, had declined substantially in quality and importance. The mainstays of an Ottoman army were the professional artillery corps and the infantry, including salaried troops such as janissaries and auxiliaries such as those fielded by the boyar aristocracy of Moldavia and Wallachia.

The Battle of Focșani
The battle began around 9:00 a.m. on August 1, 1789, as the Russian and Austrian artillery opened fire on the Turkish lines.  The Turks had fortified their camp with a line of entrenchments. Ottoman troops in the Balkans were experienced at erecting field fortifications, which could include ditches, earthen ramparts, and wooden palisades and towers. The Ottomans sortied from their defenses to attack the allies all along their battle line. Allied artillery and musket fire drove the Turks back.

Suvorov then attacked the Turkish right flank. The Russian cavalry was repulsed, but the Russian infantry attack was successful. The Turks were pushed back into their entrenchments under close range Russian fire. On the Ottoman left, the Austrian infantry also threw back the defenders. Defeated on both ends of their line, the Ottomans fled. The victory was complete by 4:00 p.m. The allies lacked the resources to pursue the Turks and advanced no further into Ottoman territory.

The Turkish casualties numbered 1,500 dead and 2,500 wounded. Allied casualties amounted to 800. The allies had captured 12 Ottoman guns.

Aftermath
With Osman Pasha beaten and driven from Moldavia, Yusuf Pasha's replacement as Grand Vizier, Cenaze Hasan Pasha, had to come up with a new strategy. In September, the Vizier himself went on the offensive with 100,000 men.  Again, Suvorov joined Coburg, and the result was a great allied victory at the Battle of Rymnik.

Order of battle
The following is a list of the units that comprised the Austro-Russian army at Focșani.

Russian units:
Apsheron Musketeer Regiment
Rostov Musketeer Regiment
Smolensk Musketeer Regiment
Jäger regiment
2 grenadier battalions
Razan Dragoon Regiment
Starodub Dragoon Regiment
Tschernigov Dragoon Regiment
Cossacks

Austrian units:
Kaiser Infantry Regiment
Kaunitz Infantry Regiment
Schröder Infantry Regiment
Wenzel Colloredo Infantry Regiment
First Szekler Grenz Regiment
Second Szekler Grenz Regiment
Karl Toscana Grenadier Battalion
Khevenhüller Grenadier Battalion
Mittrowsky Grenadier Battalion
Pellegrini Grenadier Battalion
Levenher Chevauxleger Regiment
Barco Hussar Regiment
Kaiser Hussar Regiment
Szekler Hussar Regiment
Arnauten (Albanian auxiliaries). or local auxiliaries: Wallachian for Habsburg forces, "armed Moldavian" in Russian forces

References

Sources

Black, Jeremy. The Cambridge Illustrated Atlas of Warfare: Renaissance to Revolution, 1492-1792. Cambridge: Cambridge University Press, 1996.
Criste, O., Kriege under Kaiser Josef II. Vienna: K.u.K. Kriegsarchivs, 1904. Nafziger Collection, http://usacac.army.mil/cac2/CGSC/CARL/nafziger/789GAA.pdf , http://usacac.army.mil/cac2/CGSC/CARL/nafziger/789HAA.pdf  (accessed December 20, 2017).
Field, Jacob F. "Focsani, 1 August 1789", R.G. Grant, ed., 1001 Battles that Changed the Course of History. New York: Universe Publishing, 2011.
Onacewicz, Wlodzimierz. Empires by Conquest. Fairfax: Hero Books, 1985.
Nicolle, David, and Angus McBride. Armies of the Ottoman Empire, 1775-1820. London: Osprey, 1998.
Tucker, Spencer C., ed. "Aleksandr Vasilievich Suvorov", A Global Chronology of Conflict: From the Ancient World to the Modern Middle East. ABC-CLIO, 2010.

External links
Medal For the Victory over Turks at the Battle of Focsani (accessed December 22, 2017)

Battles involving Austria
Battles involving Hungary
Battles involving the Ottoman Empire
Battles involving Russia
Military history of Romania
History of Moldavia (1711–1822)
Battle of Focsani
Conflicts in 1789
1789 in Europe
1789 in the Ottoman Empire
18th century in Moldavia
Alexander Suvorov
Battles of the Russo-Turkish War (1787–1792)